The Episcopal Conference of Uruguay (acronym CEU) is an episcopal conference of the Roman Catholic Church of Uruguay that gathers the bishops of the country in order to discuss pastoral issues and in general all matters that have to do with the Church.

The Episcopal Conference is made up of 1 archbishop, 9 ordinary bishops, 2 auxiliary bishops and 6 bishops emeritus. Its current authorities (since 2019) are:
Arturo Eduardo Fajardo Bustamante, President
Carlos María Collazzi Irazábal, Vice President
Milton Luis Tróccoli Cebedio, Secretary

See also
List of Roman Catholic dioceses in Uruguay
Roman Catholic Church in Uruguay

References

External links

Episcopal Conference of Uruguay 

Uruguay
Catholic Church in Uruguay